Oregon Route 331 (OR 331) is a short state highway in Umatilla County, Oregon. The highway runs  entirely on the Umatilla Indian Reservation from Interstate 84 to OR 11 near  Mission. OR 331 is known as the Umatilla Mission Highway No. 331 (see Oregon highways and routes).

OR 331 was established in 2003 as part of Oregon's project to assign route numbers to highways that previously were not assigned.

Route description

OR 331 begins at an interchange with Interstate 84 and U.S. Route 30 on the Umatilla Indian Reservation. The highway travels north, passing the Wildhorse Resort & Casino and the tribal headquarters to the center of Mission. The road then crosses a railroad and the Umatilla River before ascending up to a plateau formed by the river and Wildhorse Creek.

History

OR 331 was assigned to the Umatilla Mission Highway in 2003.

Major intersections

References

331
Transportation in Umatilla County, Oregon